Bengt Andersson (born 6 November 1961) is a Swedish sprint canoer who competed in the 1980s. He won five medals at the ICF Canoe Sprint World Championships with two golds (K-4 1000 m: 1982, 1985), two silvers (K-4 1000 m: 1987, K-4 10000 m: 1985), and a bronze (K-2 10000 m: 1983).

Andersson also competed in two Summer Olympics, earning his best finish of eighth twice (K-2 1000 m: 1984, K-4 1000 m: 1988).

References

External links 
 
 

1961 births
Canoeists at the 1984 Summer Olympics
Canoeists at the 1988 Summer Olympics
Living people
Olympic canoeists of Sweden
Swedish male canoeists
ICF Canoe Sprint World Championships medalists in kayak